Ambatoharanana is a rural municipality in Madagascar. It belongs to the district of Fenerive Est, which is a part of Analanjirofo region. The population of the commune was estimated to be approximately 6,000 in 2001 commune census.

Only primary schooling is available. The majority 82% of the population of the commune are farmers.  The most important crop is cloves, while other important products are coffee and rice.  Services provide employment for 18% of the population.

Roads
This municipality is linked by the Provincial road 13 to the National road 5.

References 

Populated places in Analanjirofo